StarOffice is a discontinued proprietary office suite, intended to compete with the marketing-leading Microsoft Office. It served as the basis for open-source suites OpenOffice.org and LibreOffice. StarOffice supported the OpenOffice.org XML file format, as well as the OpenDocument standard, and could generate PDF and Flash formats. It included templates, a macro recorder, and a software development kit (SDK).

The software originated in 1985 as StarWriter by Star Division, which marketed the suite with some success, primarily in Europe. StarOffice was acquired by Sun Microsystems in 1999, which released the source code the following year as a free, open source office suite called OpenOffice.org, which subsequent versions of StarOffice were based on, with additional proprietary components. Sun Microsystems was acquired by Oracle Corporation in 2010, and the product was known briefly as Oracle Open Office before being discontinued in 2011, with Oracle turning OpenOffice.org into a "purely community-based project".

History 

StarWriter 1.0 was written by Marco Börries in 1985 for the Zilog Z80. Börries formed Star Division in Lüneburg the following year. It was later ported to the Amstrad CPC (marketed by Schneider in Germany) under CP/M and later ported to the 8086-based Amstrad PC-1512, running under MS-DOS 3.2. Later, the integration of the other individual programs followed as the development progressed to an office suite for DOS, IBM's OS/2 Warp, and for the Microsoft Windows operating system. From this time onwards Star Division marketed its suite under the name "StarOffice."

Until version 4.2, Star Division based StarOffice on the cross-platform C++ class library StarView. In 1998 Star Division began offering StarOffice for free.

In March 2009, a study showed that StarOffice only had a 3% market share in the corporate market.

Naming 
StarSuite was the version of StarOffice with Asian language localization. It included Japanese, Korean, Simplified Chinese and Traditional Chinese interfaces. It also included additional fonts for the East Asian market, resulting in slightly larger installation footprint. Otherwise the features were identical to StarOffice.

The two brands existed because a StarOffice brand was owned by another company in certain Asian countries. Currently NEC produces StarOffice collaborative software (unrelated to the one discussed here) in Japan. After Oracle acquired Sun Microsystems (in January 2010) it renamed both StarOffice and StarSuite as "Oracle Open Office".

Sun ONE Webtop 
In 2001, Sun Microsystems announced Sun ONE Webtopformerly known as project StarPortala limited release. It was based on StarOffice components.

Components 
 Oracle Open Office Writer – word processor  (StarWriter 5.x)  (StarOffice 6.x)   -files
 Oracle Open Office Calc – spreadsheet  (StarCalc 5.x)  (6.x)   -files
 Oracle Open Office Impress – presentation program  (StarImpress 5.x)  (6.x)   -files
 Oracle Open Office Draw – drawing program  (StarDraw 5.x)  (6.x)   -files
 Oracle Open Office Base  – database  (StarBase 5.x)  -files
 Oracle Open Office Math – formula generator  (StarMath 5.x)  (6.x)  -files

Older discontinued components 
 StarSchedule – personal information manager  -files
 StarMail – e-mail client
 StarDiscussion – news client
 StarImage – image editor
 Web browser – web browser
 HTML editor – html editor

Proprietary components 
 Several font metric compatible Unicode TrueType fonts containing bitmap representations for better appearance at smaller font sizes
 Twelve Western fonts (including Andalé Sans, Arial Narrow, Arial Black, Broadway, Garamond, Imprint MT Shadow, Kidprint, Palace Script, Sheffield) and seven Asian language fonts (including support for the Hong Kong Supplementary character set)
 Adabas D database
 StarOffice-only templates and sample documents
 A large clip-art gallery
 Sorting functionality for Asian versions
 File-import filters for additional older word-processing formats (including EBCDIC, DisplayWrite, MultiMate, PFS Write, WordStar, WordStar 2000, and XyWrite (conversion filters licensed from MasterSoft))
 A different spell checker than that used by OpenOffice.org, and thesaurus
 StarOffice Configuration Manager
 Macro Converter for converting Microsoft Office VBA macros to StarOffice Basic

For StarOffice Enterprise Edition only:
 Professional Analysis Wizard
 Wizard to create Microsoft Windows Installer Transformation files (.mst files)

Other differences 
There are also differences in the documentation, training and support options, and some minor differences in the look and icons between Oracle Open Office and OpenOffice.org.

Other differences are that StarOffice only supports 12 languages, compared to over 110 for OpenOffice.org.

Version history

StarOffice 2.0 
StarWriter was the first StarOffice, with the successor being StarOffice 2.0 which included StarWriter compact, StarBase 1.0, StarDraw 1.0.

Supported platforms included DOS.

StarOffice 3 
StarOffice 3.0 included StarWriter 3.0, StarCalc 3.0, StarDraw 3.0, StarImage, StarChart.

Supported platforms included DOS, Windows 3.1, OS/2, Solaris on SPARC. Power Mac beta support was introduced in 1996.

3.1 
Supported platforms included Windows 3.1/95, OS/2 (16-bit), Linux i386, Solaris Sparc/x86, Mac OS 7.5 – 8.0.

Caldera, Inc. supported the Linux-port of StarOffice 3.1 with approximately 800,000 DM in order to offer the product with their forthcoming OpenLinux distribution in 1997.

StarOffice 4.0 
Supported platforms included Windows 3.1/95, OS/2, Linux i386, Solaris Sparc/x86, Mac OS (beta).

StarOffice 5 
5.0 was released late November 1998. Supported platforms included Windows 95/NT 3.51, OS/2, Linux i386, Solaris Sparc/x86.

5.1 
5.1 was released 20 May 1999. Supported platforms included Windows 95, OS/2, Linux i386, Solaris Sparc/x86.

5.2 
5.2 was released 20 June 2000. Sun offered StarOffice 5.2 as a free download for personal use, and soon went through an exercise similar to Netscape's relicensing of Mozilla, by releasing most of the StarOffice source code under a free/open source license. The resultant free/open source software codebase fork continued development as older discontinued components, with contributions from both Sun and the wider OpenOffice.org community. Sun then took "snapshots" of the OpenOffice.org code base, integrated proprietary and third-party code modules, and marketed the package commercially.

StarOffice 5.2 was the last version to contain the programs listed under older discontinued components.  It was also the last version to support multiple virtual desktops, previously available from within the Suite.

Supported platforms included: MS Windows 95, 98, NT, 2000; Linux i386; Solaris Sparc/x86.

StarOffice 6 
A beta version of 6.0 (based on OpenOffice.org 638c) was released in October 2001; the final 6.0 (based on OpenOffice.org 1.0) was released in May 2002.

Support for OpenOffice.org XML file format.

Supported platforms included Windows 95, Linux i386, Solaris Sparc/x86. OpenOffice.org version also supported Windows ME/2000 for Asian/CJK versions, generic Linux 2.2.13 with  2.1.3, Solaris 7 SPARC (8 for Asian version).

StarOffice 7 
Based on OpenOffice.org 1.1. Released 14 November 2003.

Supported platforms included Windows 98, Linux i386, Solaris 8 Sparc/x86. OpenOffice.org version also supports generic Linux with Glibc 2.2.0, Mac OS X 10.2 for PowerPC with X11 in OOO 1.1.2.

Product Update 5 added Windows NT 4.0 as a supported platform and incorporated support for the OpenDocument file-format.

Product Updates 6-8 are based on OpenOffice.org 2.1. The OOO version added support for Mac OS X 10.3 for PowerPC, and for Mac OS X 10.4 for x86.

Product Updates 9-11 built on OpenOffice.org 2.2. New features included enhanced Windows Vista integration, PDF export.

Product Update 12 was based on OpenOffice.org 2.4. The OOO version added support for Linux x86-64, Linux MIPS, Linux S390, Mac OS X x86/PPC above 10.4. New features included improved input and sorting in Calc, block markings in text documents, new import filtering, improved security, access to WebDAV servers via HTTPS, and PDF export for long-term archiving.

StarOffice 8 
Sun released StarOffice 8 (based on the code of OpenOffice.org 2.0) on 27 September 2005, adding support for the OpenDocument standard and a number of improvements.

Supported platforms include Windows 98/2000 (Service Pack 2 or higher), Linux i386, Solaris 8 Sparc/x86.

Product Updates 2–5 are based on OpenOffice.org 2.1.

Product Updates 6–7 are based on OpenOffice.org 2.2. New features include enhanced Windows Vista integration, PDF export.

Product Updates 8–9 are based on OpenOffice.org 2.3. New features include bookmark support for PDF export, MediaWiki export in Writer.

Product Updates 10–11 are based on OpenOffice.org 2.4. New features include improved input and sorting in Calc, block markings in text documents, new import filter, improved security, access to WebDAV servers via HTTPS, PDF export for long-term archiving.

StarOffice 9 

StarOffice 9, released 17 November 2008, added support for version 1.2 of the OpenDocument standard and Microsoft Office 2007 files and a number of other improvements.

It is based on OpenOffice.org 3.0.

Supported platforms include Windows 2000 (Service Pack 2 or higher), Mac OS X 10.4 (Intel version), Linux 2.4 i386 with  version 2.3.2 or higher, gtk version 2.2.0 or higher, Solaris 10 for Sparc/x86. OOO version supports Mac OS X PPC, generic Linux platforms.

Product Update 1 is based on OpenOffice.org 3.0.1, which adds improved extension manager, but requires extensions in the new format

Product Update 2 is based on OpenOffice.org 3.1.0.

Product Update 3 is based on OpenOffice.org 3.1.1.

Product Update 4 is based on OpenOffice.org 3.2.

Oracle Open Office 
Oracle bought Sun in January 2010 and quickly renamed StarOffice as Oracle Open Office.

On 15 December 2010, Oracle released Oracle Open Office 3.3, based on OpenOffice.org 3.3 beta, and a web-based version called Oracle Cloud Office.

Pricing and licensing 
P. Ulander, a desktop products manager for Sun, acknowledged that Sun planned to expand subscription-based licenses to other countries as well.

Sun used a per-person license for StarOffice, compared to the per-device licenses used for most other proprietary software. An individual purchaser gains the right to install the software on up to five computers. For example, a small-business owner can have the software on laptop, office and home computers, or a user with a computer running Microsoft Windows, and another running Linux, can install StarOffice on both computers.

In 2010, StarOffice 9 Software was no longer offered free of charge to education customers, but StarOffice 8 could still be used without charge. The free OpenOffice.org 3.0, with the same functionality as StarOffice 9, could also be used. Sun also offered free web-based training and an online tutorial for students and teachers, free support services for teachers (including educational templates for StarOffice) and significantly discounted technical support for schools.

From August 2007 to November 2008, Google offered StarOffice 8 as part of its free downloadable Google Pack application.

Derivatives 
OpenOffice.org was open source, and gave rise to many derivative versions and successor projects to StarOffice. , Apache OpenOffice, Collabora Online, LibreOffice and NeoOffice are still developed.

See also 
 Comparison of office suites

References

External links 
 

1985 software
Office suites
Office suites for Linux
Office suites for Windows
OpenOffice
Oracle software
Proprietary software
Solaris software
Sun Microsystems software